Rose "Casper" Mazzola (Rosalyn Mazzola) born 5 September 1982, is an American guitarist. She is known as a founding member of the punk rock band The Distillers, where she played guitar and sometimes sang. She left the band after the making of Sing Sing Death House. Later she was the bassist in the band Gold Cash Gold. She is the daughter of Joey Mazzola of Sponge and The Detroit Cobras fame. Mazzola currently lives in Tallahassee, Florida where she periodically plays guitar and sings at local events.

References

American punk rock guitarists
American people of Italian descent
Living people
The Distillers members
1982 births
21st-century American women guitarists
21st-century American guitarists
Women in punk